Minnesota Kings was an American Soccer team based in Minneapolis, Minnesota. Founded in 2009, the team played in National Premier Soccer League (NPSL), a national professional/amateur league at the fourth tier of the American Soccer Pyramid, in the Midwest Division.

History
Founded in 2009. The Chairman, Tim Haselberger help found the team. The club played in the NPSL (National Premier Soccer League) ranking fourth on the United States Soccer Pyramid. The team partnered up with local soccer club, St. Micheal Youth Soccer Association to create the Minnesota Kings Academy in late 2010. In three seasons the Kings finished the season near the bottom of the standings in the Midwest Division. Failing to qualify for the playoffs in each of it three seasons. In 2012 the team disbanded due to money, ownership, and league violations.

Players

All-time roster
Source: https://web.archive.org/web/20110104072929/http://www.nationalpremiersoccerleague.com/teams/21727632/21730546-21727682/TEAM.html

 
 Captain*

 Owner*

Year-by-year

Head coaches
  Brad Fewell (2010–Present)

Stadia
 Community Education Field; St. Michael, Minnesota (2010)

References

External links 
 Official site

Soccer clubs in Minneapolis–Saint Paul
Defunct soccer clubs in Minnesota
Association football clubs established in 2009
2009 establishments in Minnesota
2012 disestablishments in Minnesota
Association football clubs disestablished in 2012